Kottiyam is one of the fast developing suburban towns located at the southern end of Kollam city in Kollam district, Kerala, India. The town is home to many popular educational institutions, hospitals, restaurants, hotels, and retail stores. Kottiyam is strategically located and therefore a regular stopover for long-distance travellers wishing to freshen up during their journeys.

Geographical location
Kottiyam is on the National Highway 66 between Kazhakoottam town and Kollam City. There are regular bus services from Kollam City.

The nearest major railway station is Kollam Junction. Mayyanad railway station is closer, but some passenger trains and a few express trains have halt there. The nearest airport is Trivandrum International Airport,

Kottiyam town and Adichanalloor Panchayath
A major portion of Kottiyam town is located in Adichanalloor Panchayath. Adichanalloor is a special grade Grama Panchayath in Kollam

Places of worship
Several mosques, temples and churches are situated in this area:
Nithya Sahaya Matha Church, Kottiyam (Perpetual Succour Catholic Church, Kottiyam)
Kottiyam Thazhuthala Ganapathi temple.
Kottiyam Sree Mahavishnu temple. Narasimhamoorthy, temple
Chempottu Durga & Bhadra Devi temple, kottiyam
Umayanalloor subramanya temple (famous for ' Aana vaal pidi')
Our Lady of Immaculate Conception Church, Pullichira

Schools
 Children's Friend High School, Kottiyam
 Children's Friend  Lower Primary School, Kottiyam
 Nithya sahaya Matha Girls High School, Kottiyam
 Nithya sahaya Matha Lower Primary School, Kottiyam
 Auxilium ISC School, Kottiyam
 The King's School (Cambridge International School), Kottiyam
 Mannam Memorial NSS English Medium School, Kottiyam
 Trinity English Medium School& Play Wing, Kottiyam. Ph.No. 0474 2532968
 Thazhuthala Muslim UPS School, Kottiyam
 National public school Thazhuthala Mukhathala PO kollam

Institutions for higher education

OGTM skills academy Kottiyam

Polytechnic college
S.N Polytechnic College, Kottiyam

Arts and science college
 MMNSS College Kottiyam
MMNSS College Kottiyam was started in 1981 by the Nair Service Society in memory of its founder, Shri. Mannathu Padmanabhan. It was recognized by the University Grants Commission in 2004. As part of its extension activities, the Women's Cell, NSS and NCC units engage in free Eye testing and blood donation camps for the socially backward people of the neighbouring villages. The students have also set up a herbal garden. Though a small college, its teams in shuttle badminton, chess, cricket and football have been doing well in the intercollegiate level. The development goals set by the college for the next five years include Language lab for English, Office and Library automation and better laboratories for science subjects.

Nursing college
Holy Cross College of Nursing, Kottiyam, Kollam

ITI
Sn trust pvt ITI Kottiyam 
Bharath Matha ITI, Kottiyam

Training colleges
 Children's Friend Teachers Training Institute, Kottiyam
 Haneefa Kunju Memorial College Of Education, Kottiyam (Self Financing)
 Creative Institute

See also 
 MMNSS College Kottiyam

References

External links

 History of kottiyam video by rising Kottiyam 
 Holy Cross Hospital
 Prasens Innovative Solutions
 The King's School
 G-TEC Education Kottiyam
OGTM skills academy Kottiyam

Cities and towns in Kollam district